Anchusa azurea is a species of flowering plant in the family Boraginaceae, known by the common names garden anchusa and Italian bugloss (or just "bugloss"). It is a bristly perennial which may reach 1.5 meters tall and 60 centimeters wide. It has straight lance-shaped leaves and petite tubular flowers about 15 millimeters across with five bright violet-blue. These flowers, which typically appear May–July, are edible and attract bees. This species is native to Europe and western Asia and eastern Maghreb but is well-known elsewhere as a noxious weed. In Crete it is called agoglossos and the locals eat the tender stems boiled, steamed or fried.

The genus name Anchusa comes from the Greek 'ankousa', which is the name of a root pigment once used for cosmetic purposes.

Numerous cultivars have been selected for garden use, of which 'Loddon Royalist' has gained the Royal Horticultural Society's Award of Garden Merit. Other cultivars include 'Dropmore', 'Feltham Pride', 'Little John', and 'Opal'.

In the US, it's suitable for hardiness zones 3–8. It grows best in full sun with good drainage, and is drought tolerant once established. It may be susceptible to leaf-miner and powdery mildew.

References

External links
Jepson Manual Treatment

azurea
Flora of Europe
Flora of North Africa
Flora of Western Asia
Taxa named by Philip Miller